Echinosaura horrida, the rough teiid, is a species of lizard in the family Gymnophthalmidae. It is found in Ecuador and Colombia.

References

Echinosaura
Reptiles described in 1890
Taxa named by George Albert Boulenger